Madagascar competed at the 2018 Winter Olympics in Pyeongchang, South Korea, from 9 to 25 February 2018, with one competitor. The country returned to the Winter Olympics after last competing in 2006, which also marked its debut.

Competitors
The following is the list of number of competitors participating in the Malagasy delegation per sport.

Alpine skiing 

Madagascar qualified one female athlete, Mialitiana Clerc. Clerc was born in Madagascar, and was adopted by a French family at the age of one. She learned to ski in France. Clerc became the first female Malagasy athlete to compete at the Winter Olympics.

See also
Madagascar at the 2018 Summer Youth Olympics

References

Nations at the 2018 Winter Olympics
2018
2018 in Malagasy sport